Albert von Stein (fl. 1513–22) was a Swiss mercenary captain. During the War of the League of Cambrai, having arrived late to the Battle of Novara, he abandoned the Swiss army before the Battle of Marignano. In 1522, he was the chief of the Swiss captains in the service of Odet de Foix, Vicomte de Lautrec, and was killed commanding one of the Swiss columns at the Battle of Bicocca during the Italian War of 1521-26.

References

 Oman, Charles. A History of the Art of War in the Sixteenth Century.  London: Methuen & Co., 1937.

1522 deaths
Swiss mercenaries
Military leaders of the Italian Wars
Swiss military personnel killed in action
Year of birth unknown